A scale of vowels is an arrangement of vowels in order of perceived "pitch".

A scale used for poetry in American English lists the vowels by the frequency of the second formant (the higher of the two overtones that define a vowel sound).  Starting with the highest,

{| class="IPA wikitable"
! vowel
! example
|- 
|iː
|key
|-
|eɪ
|cane
|-
|aɪ
|kite
|-
|ɪ
|kit
|-
|ɛ
|ken
|-
|æ
|cat
|-
|ɝː
|cur
|-
|ʌ
|cut
|-
|ɑː
|cot, car
|-
|aʊ
|cow
|-
|ɔɪ
|coy
|-
|ɔː
|caught, core
|-
|ʊ
|could
|-
| oʊ
| coat
|-
| uː
| cool, cute
|}

In technical terms, this listing goes from front vowels to back vowels. It is by no means precise enough for phonology. Also, many American accents and practically all from other countries will require different lists. Nonetheless this scale has been used in poetry. For instance, one can identify lines that generally go upward—
O love, be fed with apples while you may… (Robert Graves)
/oʊ ˈlʊv bi ˈfɛd wɪθ ˈæ.pl̩z ˈwaɪl ju ˈmeɪ/

or downward—
When lilacs last in the dooryard bloom'd… (Walt Whitman)
/wɛn ˈlaɪ.læks ˌlæst ɪn ðə ˈdɔɹ.jɑɹd ˌblumd/

A pendeka (from the Greek for "fifteen") is a poem containing each of the above vowels once.  The following example, which goes up the scale, is intended strictly as a mnemonic.

Mood: no good, brought voice
Down, not up, perhaps
Ends with—Hi, baby!

Not to be confused with

The high- and low-frequency vowels described here are not the high vowels and low vowels of linguistics.  Those are vowels where the tongue is high (as in "cool" and "key") or low (as in "car") respectively.  Also, this scale is not the sonority hierarchy.

References
   For the pendeka, see the 1982 edition, .

Prosody (linguistics)
Melody